The Master of 1518 is a Flemish painter belonging to the stylistic school of Antwerp Mannerism.  A group of unsigned paintings is attributed to this artist on stylistic grounds, and his name is derived from the date inscribed on the painted wings of a carved wooden altarpiece of the Life of the Virgin in St. Mary's Church in Lübeck Germany.  Although this artist’s identity is not known with certainty, some scholars believe that the Master of 1518 was either Jan Mertens the Younger or Jan van Dornicke, or that all three were the same person.  His paintings are primarily crowded depictions of religious scenes combining Gothic and Renaissance styles.  He frequently incorporated elaborate clothing and architectural ruins.

References
 Friedländer, Max J. Early Netherlandish Painting, Trans. Heinz Norden. New York: Praeger, 1967-1976, 11:29-33

Early Netherlandish painters
1518